An Angel on Wheels is a 1959 French-West German romantic comedy film starring Romy Schneider, Henri Vidal and Jean-Paul Belmondo.

It was also known in France as Mademoiselle Ange and in Germany as Ein Engel auf Erden.

It had admissions in France of 891,190.

Cast 
 Romy Schneider as Line 
 Henri Vidal  as Pierre Chaillot 
 Michèle Mercier  as  Augusta de Munchenberg 
 Jean-Paul Belmondo as Michel Barrot 
 Jean Brochard  as  Le père de Line
 Jean Tissier as Le présentateur du numéro du magicien au Riviera Club
 Paulette Dubost  as La mère de Line
  Margarethe Hagen as L'ange chef
  Erika Von Thallman as  La tante d'Augusta
 Ernst Waldow as Corelli
  Mario Beunat as Le commentateur de la radio
  Jean Panisse as  Le pompiste
 Gérard Darrieu as  Le chef de l'aéroport
  Pierre Sergeol   as  Commissioner
  Roland Rodier  as Antonio 
 René Worms  as Le valet de chambre de la tante
 Lucien Callamand as  Man at marriage

References

External links

Film page at Le Film guide

1959 films
Films directed by Géza von Radványi
French romantic comedy films
1950s French-language films
1959 romantic comedy films
Films about flight attendants
Films with screenplays by René Barjavel
1950s French films